The NWA United States Tag Team Championship is a professional wrestling tag team championship contested in the National Wrestling Alliance. This version is the eleventh version of the championship.

On July 19, 2022, the NWA announced that the United States Tag Team Championship would be revived after five years of inactivity, and new champions would be determined in a 12 team battle royal on Night 2 of NWA 74. All participants except for the final team were announced on NWA programming (Powerrr and USA) in the weeks leading up to NWA 74. The final team was revealed after the first eleven teams had entered the ring for the match.

Belt design
The original belts have a similar design to a version of the titles from Championship Wrestling from Florida. On the October 29, 2022 edition of NWA USA, NWA President Billy Corgan unveiled new belts, bearing a similar design of the Detroit version of the NWA United States Heavyweight Championship. But The Fixers' Wrecking Ball Legursky refused to swap the title belts with Corgan. On January 31, 2023 when the Fixers were defeated by The Country Gentleman for the championship, the title belts were finally swapped out.

Reigns

See also

List of National Wrestling Alliance championships
NWA World Tag Team Championship
List of NWA World Tag Team Champions

References

External links

National Wrestling Alliance championships
Tag team wrestling championships
United States professional wrestling championships